Ben Reynolds (born 15 January 1994) is an English professional rugby league footballer who plays as a goal-kicking  or  for the Leigh Centurions in the Betfred Championship.

Background
Reynolds was born in Wakefield, West Yorkshire, England. Married to Lindsey Reynolds in 2018. The couple together have two children, Reuben & Rex.

Career
Reynolds has previously played for the Castleford Tigers (Heritage № 941) in the Super League, making his début in 2013. He spent most of the 2014 season on a dual registration contract with the York City Knights and was named Championship One Young Player of the Year at the end of the season.

Leigh Centurions
In October 2014, Reynolds signed a contract with the Leigh Centurions for the 2015 season, with the Castleford Tigers having the first option to re-sign him for the 2016 season. He has spent time on loan at Doncaster and the Dewsbury Rams.

Toulouse Olympique
On 10 August 2020 it was announced that Reynolds would join Toulouse Olympique for the 2021 season.

Leigh (re-join)
On 1 April 2021, it was reported that he had signed for Leigh in the Super League.
On 28 May 2022, Reynolds played for Leigh in their 2022 RFL 1895 Cup final victory over Featherstone.
On 17 July 2022, Reynolds scored two tries and kicked three goals in Leigh's 60-6 victory over Dewsbury.

References

External links
Leigh Centurions profile
Leigh profile
Centurions profile
Dewsbury Rams profile

1994 births
Living people
Castleford Tigers players
Dewsbury Rams players
Doncaster R.L.F.C. players
English rugby league players
Featherstone Rovers players
Leigh Leopards players
Rugby league fullbacks
Rugby league halfbacks
Rugby league players from Pontefract
Toulouse Olympique players
Wakefield Trinity players
York City Knights players